Overbrook School may refer to:

Overbrook Elementary School, Philadelphia, Pennsylvania
Overbrook High School (Philadelphia), Philadelphia, Pennsylvania
Overbrook High School (New Jersey), Pine Hill, New Jersey
Overbrook School for the Blind, Philadelphia, Pennsylvania